George J. Lewis (December 10, 1903December 8, 1995) was a Mexican-born actor who appeared in many films and eventually TV series from the 1920s through the 1960s, usually specializing in westerns. He is probably best known for playing Don Alejandro de la Vega, who was Don Diego de la Vega's father in the 1950s Disney television series Zorro. Lewis co-starred in Zorro's Black Whip and had a minor role in Ghost of Zorro before starring as Don Alejandro in the Disney series.

Career
Lewis broke into films in the 1920s, and his handsome presence led to leading roles in a Universal Pictures short-subject series, The Collegians. The arrival of sound movies came as a blessing for Lewis, who was bilingual. He spoke English without any trace of accent, and could play character or dialect roles of practically any ethnicity. His language skills earned him leading roles in Spanish-dialogue features, produced by American studios for international release. He also played supporting roles in Educational Pictures shorts.

Most of Lewis' screen work was in low-budget films, although he can be seen in a few major productions (in Casablanca he's an Arab peddler with a monkey). Some of his roles were sympathetic; he played the male leads in the 1944 serial Zorro's Black Whip and in the Vera Vague comedy shorts of the 1940s. Usually, George J. Lewis played villains in westerns and serials, chiefly at Republic Pictures. Cast as a sinister henchman, Lewis would carry out the villain's diabolical orders, setting death traps and ambushes week after week. The high point of Lewis's serial career was probably the 1945 Republic cliffhanger Federal Operator 99, in which he was the full-fledged villain of the piece, playing "Moonlight Sonata" on a piano while plotting crimes. Holding the heroine captive, the nonchalant Lewis asks the hero: "What will it be? Cash for me... or incineration for Miss Kingston?" He appeared in Three Stooges films as Vernon Dent's knife-wielding conspirator in the Stooge short Malice in the Palace, and its remake, Rumpus in the Harem. He was also featured with the Stooges (as George Lewis) in Hollywood's final two-reel comedy release, Sappy Bull Fighters.

Many low-budget filmmakers scored successes in early television, and many familiar faces turned up in half-hour action fare.

Lewis appeared in the first two episodes of The Lone Ranger which were "Enter the Lone Ranger" and "The Lone Ranger Fights On". He was a villain who helped betray a group of Texas Rangers and led them all into a deadly ambush, with the series star of course being the lone survivor. He played a Native American in an Adventures of Superman episode called "Test of a Warrior."

Lewis was cast as General Mariano Guadalupe Vallejo in the 1956 episode, "The Bear Flag" of the syndicated anthology series, Death Valley Days, hosted by Stanley Andrews. The episode explains the tensions in 1846 between established Hispanic families in California and the newly-arrived white settlers from the United States. General Vallejo seeks accommodation with the forces headed by Ezekiel "Stuttering Zeke" Merritt (Don C. Harvey) in establishing the short-term Bear Flag Republic.

Lewis continued to work in dozens of television episodes including Daniel Boone & Cheyenne until he retired in 1969.

Death
Lewis died of a stroke in 1995, two days before his 92nd birthday.

Selected filmography

 The Spanish Dancer (1923) - (uncredited)
 Code of the Sea (1924) - Party Guest (uncredited)
 Captain Blood (1924) - Henri d'Ogeron
 Three Women (1924) - College Boy (uncredited)
 The Lady Who Lied (1925) - Mahmud 
 Sherlock Sleuth (1925) - Party Boy (uncredited)
 His People (1925) - Sammy Cominsky
 Devil's Island (1926) - Léon Valyon
 The Old Soak (1926) - Clemmy Hawley
 The Collegians (1926) - Ed Benson
 Benson at Calford (1926) - Ed Benson
 Fighting to Win (1926) - Ed Benson
 Making Good (1926) - Ed Benson
 The Last Lap (1926) - Ed Benson
 Around the Bases (1927) - Ed Benson
 The Fighting Spirit (1927) - Ed Benson
 The Relay (1927) - Ed Benson
 The Cinder Path (1927) - Ed Benson
 Flashing Oars (1927) - Ed Benson
 Breaking Records (1927) - Ed Benson
 Crimson Colors (1927) - Ed Benson
 The Winning Five (1927) - Ed Benson
 The Dazzling Co-Ed (1927) - Ed Benson
 A Fighting Finish (1927) - Ed Benson
 Samson at Calford (1927) - Ed Benson
 The Winning Punch (1927) - Ed Benson
 The Fourflusher (1928) - Andy Wittaker
 13 Washington Square (1928) - Jack De Peyster 
 Honeymoon Flats (1928) - Jim Clayton 
 We Americans (1928) - Phil Levine
 Jazz Mad (1928) - Leopold Ostberg 
 Give and Take (1928) - 'Jack' Bauer Jr.
 College Love (1929) - Robert Wilson
 Tonight at Twelve (1929) - Tony Keith
 En nombre de la amistad (1930)
 El último de los Vargas (1930) - José Vargas
 La gran jornada (1931) - Raul Coleman
 Cuerpo y alma (1931) - Ted
 Marido y mujer (1932) - Eddie Collins 
 South of the Rio Grande (1932) - Corporal Ramon Ruiz 
 Águilas frente al sol (1932) - Frank Richardson 
 A Parisian Romance (1932) - Pierre 
 The Heart Punch (1932) - Lefty Doyle
 Call Her Savage (1932) - Party Guest (uncredited)
 The Whispering Shadow (1933, Serial) - Bud Foster [Ch.1, 8] (uncredited)
Her Resale Value (1933) - Dr. Ted Harris 
 The Wolf Dog (1933) - Bob Whitlock
 No dejes la puerta abierta (1933) - Darmant 
 The Pecos Dandy (1934) - The Pecos Dandy
 Lazy River (1934) - Armand Lescalle
 Allez Oop (1934) - The Great Apollo
 Two Heads on a Pillow (1934) - Anthony Populopulini
 The Merry Widow (1934) - Escort (uncredited)
 Red Morning (1934) - Mao
 Storm Over the Andes (1935) - Garcia 
 The Headline Woman (1935) - O'Shay, Reporter
 Under the Pampas Moon (1935) - Aviator
 Alas sobre El Chaco (1935) - El operador de la radio
 The Fighting Marines (1935, Serial) - Sgt. William Schiller [Chs. 1-4] 
 Captain Calamity (1936) - Pierre 
 El capitan Tormenta (1936) - Pedro
 Dummy Ache (1936) - The Actor
 Ride Ranger Ride (1936) - Lieutenant Bob Cameron
 El carnaval del diablo (1936)
 Back Door to Heaven (1939) - Bob Hale 
 Di que me quieres (1939) - Carlos Madero
 Man of Conquest (1939) - Man at Tennessee Rally (uncredited)
 Beware Spooks! (1939) - Danny Emmett
 The Middleton Family at the New York World's Fair (1939) - Nicholas Makaroff
 Outside the Three-Mile Limit (1940) - Ed Morrow
 Men Against the Sky (1940) - Lt. Norval (uncredited)
 They Met in Argentina (1941) - Reporter at the Racetrack (uncredited)
 The Get-Away (1941) - Hoodlum in Montage (uncredited)
 Kansas Cyclone (1941) - Undetermined Secondary Role (uncredited)
 It Started with Eve (1941) - Maitre d' (uncredited)
 Death Valley Outlaws (1941) - Bank Teller (uncredited)
 Outlaws of the Desert (1941) - Yussuf
 No Hands on the Clock (1941) - Dave Paulson
 Riders of the Badlands (1941) - Henchman Kirk (uncredited)
 Road Agent (1941) - Henchman Lace (uncredited)
 Gang Busters (1942, Serial) - Joey Morrison - aka Mason 
 Spy Smasher (1942, Serial) - Stuart, Warehouse Spy [Ch. 8] (uncredited)
 Perils of Nyoka (1942) - Batan, Arab Henchman 
 A Yank in Libya (1942) - Sheik Ibrahim 
 Halfway to Shanghai (1942) - Brakeman (uncredited)
 Sin Town (1942) - Oil Man (uncredited)
 Phantom Killer (1942) - Kramer 
 The Falcon's Brother (1942) - Valdez
 Outlaws of Pine Ridge (1942) - Henchman Ross
 Casablanca (1942) - Haggling Arab Monkey Seller (uncredited)
 G-Men vs the Black Dragon (1943, Serial) - Lugo 
 They Got Me Covered (1943) - Foreign Correspondent (uncredited)
 The Blocked Trail (1943) - Freddy
 Flesh and Fantasy (1943) - Harlequin (uncredited)
 Daredevils of the West (1943) - Turner - Henchman
 Batman (1943, Serial) - Henchman Burke (uncredited)
 Secret Service in Darkest Africa (1943, Serial) - Kaba [Ch.9] (uncredited)
 The Masked Marvel (1943) - Philip Morton (uncredited)
 Black Hills Express (1943) - Henchman Vic Fowler 
 The Texas Kid (1943) - Murdered Stage Driver 
 Tarzan's Desert Mystery (1943) - Ali Baba Hassan (uncredited)
 The Impostor (1944) - Soldier (uncredited)
 Captain America (1944, Serial) - Bart Matson
 Charlie Chan in the Secret Service (1944) - Paul Arranto
 The Laramie Trail (1944) - John Emerson, aka Blackie Mason
 The Tiger Woman (1944) - Morgan
 The Desert Hawk (1944, Serial) - Captain of Emir's Bodyguard (uncredited)
 Raiders of Ghost City (1944) - Fred (uncredited)
 The Falcon in Mexico (1944) - Domingo (uncredited)
 Haunted Harbor (1944) - Dranga
 Oh, What a Night (1944) - Rocco 
 Shadow of Suspicion (1944) - Paul Randall 
 Black Arrow (1944, Serial) - Snake-That-Walks
 Zorro's Black Whip (1944) - Vic Gordon
 Brazil (1944) - Messenger (uncredited)
 Can't Help Singing (1944) - Cavalry Officer (uncredited)
 Federal Operator 99 (1945, Serial) - Jim Belmont
 The White Gorilla (1945) - Hutton
 Lady on a Train (1945) - Reporter (uncredited)
 The Gay Senorita (1945) - Torreon (uncredited)
 South of the Rio Grande (1945) - Miguel Sanchez
 Mexicana (1945) - Caballero
 Wagon Wheels Westward (1945) - Lunsford
 Song of Mexico (1945) - Arturo Martinez
 Tarzan and the Leopard Woman (1946) - Corporal (uncredited)
 Because of Him (1946) - Reporter (uncredited)
 The Phantom Rider (1946, Serial) - Blue Feather
 Gilda (1946) - Huerta (uncredited)
 Perilous Holiday (1946) - Florist (uncredited)
 The Gay Cavalier (1946) - Wedding Guest (uncredited)
 Rainbow Over Texas (1946) - Jim Pollard
 Passkey to Danger (1946) - Julian Leighton
 South of Monterey (1946) - Carlos Mandreno
 The Missing Lady (1946) - Jan Field 
 Under Nevada Skies (1946) - Chief Flying Eagle
 The Thrill of Brazil (1946) - Bartender in Production Number (uncredited)
 Beauty and the Bandit (1946) - Capitan
 Twilight on the Rio Grande (1947) - Captain Gonzáles
 Web of Danger (1947) - Masher at Restaurant (uncredited)
 Slave Girl (1947) - Dialogue Captive Sailor (segment "He's in the same boat we are', etc.) (uncredited)
 Blackmail (1947) - Blue Chip Winslow
 The Wistful Widow of Wagon Gap (1947) - Cowpuncher (uncredited)
 Pirates of Monterey (1947) - Pirate (uncredited)
 The Woman from Tangier (1948) - Albert Franz - the Pilot (uncredited)
 To the Ends of the Earth (1948) - Ship's Cook Who Is Lying About Fire (uncredited)
 Docks of New Orleans (1948) - Police Sgt. Dansiger
 Oklahoma Blues (1948) - Henchman Slip Drago
 Casbah (1948) - Detective (uncredited)
 Lulu Belle (1948) - Capt. Ralph (uncredited)
 One Touch of Venus (1948) - Detective #2 (uncredited)
 Silver Trails (1948) - José Esteban
 Tap Roots (1948) - Confederate (uncredited)
 The Sheriff of Medicine Bow (1948) - Henchman Buckeye
 The Gallant Blade (1948) - Servant (uncredited)
 Adventures of Frank and Jesse James (1948) - Rafe Henley
 Renegades of Sonora (1948) - Chief Eagle Claw
 The Feathered Serpent (1948) - Capt. Juan Gonzalez
 Crashing Thru (1949) - Henchman Jarvis
 Shockproof (1949) - Border Patrolman (uncredited)
 The Big Sombrero (1949) - Juan Vazcaro
 Ghost of Zorro (1949) - Moccasin
 The Lost Tribe (1949) - Steve 'Whip' Wilson
 Malice in the Palace (1949) - Ginna Rumma
 Prison Warden (1949) - Yardbird Refusing Quarry Work (uncredited)
 Bandits of El Dorado (1949) - Colonel José Vargas
 The Dalton Gang (1949) - Chief Irahu
 Radar Patrol vs. Spy King (1949) - Lt. Manuel Agura
 Captain Carey, U.S.A. (1950) - Giovanni
 Buccaneer's Girl (1950) - Sailor (uncredited)
 Hostile Country (1950) - Jim Knowlton - the Oliver imposter
 One Way Street (1950) - Capt. Rodriguez
 Cody of the Pony Express (1950) - Mortimer Black
 Marshal of Heldorado (1950) - Nate Tulliver 
 Crooked River (1950) - Deke Gentry 
 Colorado Ranger (1950) - Henchman Tony 
 West of the Brazos (1950) - Manuel
 Fast on the Draw (1950) - Henchman Pedro 
 Crisis (1950) - Hotel Desk Clerk (uncredited)
 Branded (1950) - Andy (uncredited)
 Southside 1-1000 (1950) - Gornoy
 King of the Bullwhip (1950) - Henchman Rio
 Short Grass (1950) - Diego
 Al Jennings of Oklahoma (1951) - Sammy Page
 The Sword of Monte Cristo (1951) - Conspirator (uncredited)
 Abbott and Costello Meet the Invisible Man (1951) - Torpedo Al (uncredited)
 Saddle Legion (1951) - Mexican Police Captain
 Appointment with Danger (1951) - Leo Cronin
 The Golden Horde (1951) - Noyou (uncredited)
 South of Caliente (1951) - Gypsy Henchman (uncredited)
 The Kid from Amarillo (1951) - Don José Figaroa
 Red Mountain (1951) - Quantrell Man
 Thunder in the East (1951) - Bartender (uncredited)
 Viva Zapata! (1952) - Rurale (uncredited)
 Hold That Line (1952) - Mike Donelli 
 Wagon Team (1952) - Carlos de la Torre
 The Raiders (1952) - Vicente
 The Prisoner of Zenda (1952) - Uhlan Guard at Hunting Lodge (uncredited)
 The Iron Mistress (1952) - Col. Wells
 The Bad and the Beautiful (1952) - 'Far Away Mountain' Test Actor #2 (uncredited)
 The Bandits of Corsica (1953) - Arturo
 Desert Legion (1953) - Lt. Lopez
 Shane (1953) - Ryker Man (uncredited)
 Cow Country (1953) - Sanchez
 Devil's Canyon (1953) - Colonel Jorge Gomez
 The Veils of Bagdad (1953) - Captain (uncredited)
 Border River (1954) - Sanchez
 Phantom of the Rue Morgue (1954) - Gendarme Duval (uncredited)
 Saskatchewan (1954) - Lawson
 Drum Beat (1954) - Capt. Alonzo Clark 
 The Prodigal (1955) - Guard (uncredited)
 Davy Crockett (1955) 
 Hell on Frisco Bay (1956) - Father Larocca
 Rumpus in the Harem (1956) - Ginna Rumma (archive footage)
 The First Texan (1956) - Mexican Military Doctor (uncredited)
 Santiago (1956) - Pablo
 A Cry in the Night (1956) - George Gerrity
 Lust for Life (1956) - Gendarme (uncredited)
 The Big Land (1957) - Dawson
 Jeanne Eagels (1957) - Foreman (uncredited)
 The Brothers Rico (1957) - El Camino Hotel Desk Clerk (uncredited)
 The Tall Stranger (1957) - Chavez
 Gunman's Walk (1958) - Cattleman (uncredited)
 Sappy Bull Fighters (1959) - Jose
 Guns of the Timberland (1960) - Jud (uncredited)
 The Comancheros (1961) - Chief Iron Shirt (uncredited)
 Kid Galahad (1962) - Romero's Trainer (uncredited)
 7 Faces of Dr. Lao (1964) - Mr. Frisco (uncredited)
 Indian Paint (1965) - Nopawallo 
 Batman (1966) - Spanish Delegate (uncredited)

Selected television

References

External links

1903 births
1995 deaths
American male film actors
American male television actors
Mexican emigrants to the United States
Hispanic and Latino American male actors
Mexican male film actors
Mexican male television actors
Male film serial actors
Male actors from Guadalajara, Jalisco
20th-century American male actors
20th-century American comedians